Candiolo is a comune (municipality) in the Metropolitan City of Turin in the Italian region Piedmont, located about  southwest of Turin. It is seat of the Istituto per la Ricerca e Cura del Cancro (IRCC, "Institute for Research and Cure of Cancer").

Twin towns — sister cities
Candiolo is twinned with:

  Santa Cruz, Cape Verde, since 2005
  Pouilly-sous-Charlieu, France, since 2007

References

External links
 Official website

Cities and towns in Piedmont